Polyethylene glycol–polyvinyl alcohol (PEG-PVA) brand name Kollicoat IR (BASF) is a  multifunctional excipient used as a pill binder as well as a wet binder. A typical formulation is composed of 25% polyethylene glycol (PEG) and 75% polyvinyl alcohol (PVA); where the vinyl alcohol moieties are grafted on a polyethylene glycol backbone.

See also
Polyvinylpolypyrrolidone

References

Excipients
Polymers